Chuzhi is a 1973 Indian Malayalam-language drama film, directed by Triprayar Sukumaran. The film stars Savitri, Salam and Sujatha. It is the only Malayalam film in which Savitri acted as a heroine. The film was released on 7 December 1973.

Plot 
Varghese is a planter who lives with his wife Elizabeth and daughter Beena in the tea estates owned by him. Following his son's demise, Varghese starts drinking in his depression and entices his wife into it. Elizabeth becomes an alcoholic.

Varghese dies and Elizabeth appoints Baby, who is her faithful servant Antony's son, as the tea estates manager. Baby and Beena are classmates. Baby is corrupt by nature, but Beena, who is in love with him, is confident of changing him.

Elizabeth deteriorates further. In a drunken stupor she even gets into a physical relationship with Baby and becomes pregnant.

Beena learns of this. Out of shame and repentance, Elizabeth commits suicide. Beena rushes to shoot Baby. But even before she could do so Baby kills himself. Beena becomes a nun.

Cast 
 Savitri as Elizabeth
 Salam as Baby
 Sujatha as Beena
 Kottarakkara Sreedharan Nair
 N. Govindan Kutty as Varghese
 Bahadur
 Nilambur Balan
 Abbas as Anthony

Production 
The film was shot at Newton and Syamala studios and at Kalpetta in Wayanad district. The dialogues and screenplay were written by Salam and N. P. Mohammed respectively. The film was based on a story written by S. G. Bhasker. Cinematography was handled by Moorthy and editing by Ravi. Savitri played the role of an alcoholic.

Soundtrack 
The music was composed by M. S. Baburaj.

Release and reception 
This was one of the early films in Malayalam cinema that was issued an "A" (adults only) certificate by the CBFC.

References

External links 
 

1970s Malayalam-language films
1973 drama films
1973 films
Indian drama films